The men's 4 × 400 metres relay event at the 1981 Summer Universiade was held at the Stadionul Naţional in Bucharest on 24  and 26 July 1981.

Results

Heats

Final

References

Athletics at the 1981 Summer Universiade
1981